SVQ may refer to:
 Scottish Vocational Qualification
 San Pablo Airport, Seville, Spain (IATA airport code)
 Sorenson Video Quantizer (also known as Sorenson codec), a digital video codec devised by the company Sorenson Media
 SVQ, a music file format for sequencers from Roland Corporation